A shad is a herring-like fish of the subfamily Alosinae, particularly of the genus Alosa.

Shad may also refer to:

People
Shad (rapper), born Shadrach Kabango, Canadian hip hop musician
Shad Barry, American baseball player
Shad Darsigny (born 2003), Canadian weightlifter
Shad Gaspard, (1981–2020) American wrestler
Shad Saleem Faruqi, Malaysian law professor
Shad Meier, American football player
Shad Gregory Moss, better known as Bow Wow
Shad Petosky, American comics writer
Shad Qadri, Canadian politician
Shad Royston, Australian rugby player
John S.R. Shad, American politician and diplomat
Shad Tubman, or William V.S. Tubman, Jr. in full

Places
Shad, Iran, a village in Razavi Khorasan Province, Iran
Shad Bagh in Punjab, Pakistan
Shad Cam, extreme southern portion of Mount Wellington in New York.
Shad Bay, Nova Scotia
Shad, West Virginia
Shad Thames, a London street

Organizations and events
Shad Alliance, American anti-nuclear group
Shad Planking, an annual Virginian political event
Canadian Forces Naval Reserve, The Reserve Component of Canadian Forces Maritime Command whose members are commonly referred to as "Shads"
SHAD (summer program) (formerly Shad Valley), Canadian non-for-profit organization and summer enrichment program for high school students

Transportation
Shad boat, a type of boat
Shad-Wyck, American automobile
, the name of more than one United States Navy ship
Kingston-class coastal defence vessel, a class of commissioned vessels of the Canadian Navy crewed by reservists, commonly referred to as "Shadillacs"

Other
ShAD, Ground Attack Aviation Division of the Soviet Air Forces
Shad (Wild Cards), fictional character in the Wild Cards book series
Shad (prince), Turkic title
Amelanchier, also known as shadbush, shadblow, and shadwood
Mayfly, also known as a shadfly
Project SHAD, American military project
Danda, a punctuation mark known as "shad" when writing Tibetan or ʼPhags-pa
Rgya Gram Shad, the Tibetan character "༒"
The Shad Treatment, 1977 novel by Garrett Epps

Arabic masculine given names